The Australian Endurance Championship is an Australian motor racing title which has been awarded by the Confederation of Australian Motor Sport in numerous years and for numerous categories since 1981.

History

Touring cars
The title was first contested as a championship for car manufacturers. Replacing the Australian Championship of Makes, which had been held from 1976 to 1980, it was decided over a series of endurance races for cars complying with CAMS Group C Touring Car regulations. In the years from 1982 to 1984, the winner of the Australian Endurance Championship was the most successful driver rather than the manufacturer. The Australian Endurance Championship of Makes, run concurrently with the drivers’ title, was the new name for the manufacturers’ award.

For 1985 the manufacturers’ title was again renamed, now becoming the Australian Manufacturers' Championship. The dual Australian Endurance Championship / Australian Manufacturers' Championship titles were contested in both 1985 and 1986 over a series of endurance races for cars complying with Australian Touring Car regulations, which were based on International Group A. No Australian Endurance Championship was awarded in the years from 1987 to 1989, however the Australian Manufacturers' Championship continued, now contested over the same series of sprint races as the Australian Touring Car Championship.

In 1990 CAMS re-instated the Australian Endurance Championship, once again as a drivers’ championship, run over a series of endurance races for Group 3A Touring Cars. The Australian Manufacturers' Championship title was moved back to this series in the same year, however this format was only utilised for two years and the titles were not contested in 1992. From 2013 onwards, an Enduro Cup was awarded to the drivers scoring the most championship points over the three two-driver endurance events in the Supercars Championship.

Production cars
The CAMS Australian Endurance Championship title was revived in 2011 and contested within the Australian Manufacturers' Championship from that year through to 2015.

GT cars
From 2016, the CAMS Australian Endurance Championship was contested by Australian GT cars. The inaugural season included four 101 lap races, at Phillip Island Grand Prix Circuit, Sydney Motorsport Park, Hampton Downs Motorsport Park and the Highlands 101 at Highlands Motorsport Park. In 2018, the Australian Endurance Championship was conducted over the three Endurance rounds of the Australian GT Championship, rather than being contested as a separate series.

Champions
The following table lists the winners of the Australian Endurance Championship as awarded by the Confederation of Australian Motor Sport.

Multiple winners

By driver

By manufacturer

Australian Production Car Endurance Championship
CAMS also awarded an Australian Production Car Endurance Championship in 2011 and 2012. It was contested with the Australian Manufacturers' Championship in both years.

Champions
The following table lists the winners of the Australian Production Car Endurance Championship as awarded by the Confederation of Australian Motor Sport.

AASA claim
The Australian Autosport Alliance (AASA) has previously run a competition it dubbed the Australian Endurance Championship.

An alternate sanctioning body to CAMS, which ran the Australian Endurance Championship from 1981 to present, the AASA competition is not considered official or legitimate, and is not a recognised competition by the Australian Office of Sport.

The AASA competition centered on placing a title across the otherwise disconnected events, which in 2013 saw its title \awarded to highest point-scorer in the Wakefield 300 and Winton 300 endurance events.

In 2014, it also included the Willowbank 300 at Queensland Raceway. This 3 event series was won by Justin Ruggier and Mark Mackay.

See also
 Australian Manufacturers' Championship
 Enduro Cup

References

Australian Motor Racing Yearbooks, 1981/82 to 1991/92
CAMS Manual of Motor Sport, 1981 to 1991

External links
www.cams.com.au